Gokseong station is a KTX station in the county of Gokseong, South Jeolla Province, on the southern coast of South Korea. It is on the Jeolla Line.

History
The station opened on October 15, 1933, and KTX trains on the Jeolla Line began services on October 5, 2011.

References

External links
 Cyber station information from Korail

Railway stations in South Jeolla Province
Gokseong County
Railway stations opened in 1933
Korea Train Express stations